Kent C. (Oz) Nelson is an American businessman who is the retired Chairman and Chief Executive Officer of United Parcel Service, a position he held from November 1989 to December 1996. He now lives in Atlanta, Georgia.

A native of Kokomo, Indiana, Nelson received a Bachelor of Arts degree in business administration from Ball State University in 1959. At Ball State, Oz became a brother of the Sigma Phi Epsilon fraternity.

Nelson is chairman of the Annie E. Casey Foundation, the world's largest foundation dedicated to helping disadvantaged children. He serves as a director of the United Way of America and the United Way of Metropolitan Atlanta.

He has been active in several educational initiatives: the Partnership for Kentucky Schools and the Atlanta Chamber of Commerce Education Committee. Nelson was also appointed to the Georgia Governors Education Reform Committee. Nelson serves on the Board of Trustees of The Carter Center of Emory University and the Ball State University Foundation. He is also a member of the board of directors Columbia/HCA Healthcare Corporation and the CDC Foundation.

Ball State University has honored him with two awards: the Distinguished Alumni Award in 1991 and the Business Hall of Fame Award in 1990. He received an honorary doctoral degree from Ball State University in 1994. He also received an honorary doctoral degree of management from Kettering University in June 1993.

References

Ball State University alumni
People from Kokomo, Indiana
Year of birth missing (living people)
Living people